John Peter Kane (born 15 December 1960) is an English former professional footballer who played as a central defender in the Football League for Orient. He also played non-league football in the Essex area for clubs including Rainham Town, Leytonstone & Ilford, Walthamstow Avenue and Redbridge Forest.

References

1960 births
Living people
Footballers from the London Borough of Hackney
English footballers
Association football defenders
Leyton Orient F.C. players
Rainham Town F.C. players
Redbridge Forest F.C. players
Walthamstow Avenue F.C. players
English Football League players
Isthmian League players